Zaur Eduardovich Tedeyev (born 18 September 1981) is a Russian professional football coach and a former player. He is the manager of FC Alania Vladikavkaz.

Playing career
As a player, he made his debut in the Russian Premier League in 1999 for FC Alania Vladikavkaz.

Coaching career
On 25 September 2021, he was appointed caretaker manager of FC Rostov. On 26 October 2021, Vitaly Kafanov was appointed as Rostov's manager, and Tedeyev was appointed as Kafanov's assistant. Rostov won 2 out of 4 games under Tedeyev's management.

References

1981 births
Living people
Russian footballers
Association football midfielders
FC Spartak Vladikavkaz players
Russian Premier League players
Russian football managers
Russian expatriate football managers
Expatriate football managers in Kazakhstan
FC Spartak Vladikavkaz managers
FC Rostov managers
Russian Premier League managers